L. canus may refer to:
 Larus canus, a medium-sized gull species
 Lenothrix canus, an Old World rat species